The Marriage Bed is a Canadian television film, directed by Martin Lavut and broadcast by CBC Television in 1986. Adapted from the novel by Constance Beresford-Howe, the film stars Linda Griffiths as Annie Graham, a woman who is pregnant with her third child but whose marriage to her husband Ross (Layne Coleman) is breaking down, who is confronted by her friends and family about her choice to concentrate on being a housewife and mother rather than pursuing her career as a botanist.

The film's cast also includes Jan Rubeš and Vivian Reis as Annie's parents Max and Billie, Lyn Jackson as Ross's mother Edwina and R. H. Thomson as Dr. Jeff Reilly, as well as Clare Coulter, Martha Gibson, Eric Keenleyside, Carole Lazare and Sheila McCarthy in supporting roles.

For the purposes of the film, writer Anna Sandor set the story around the Christmas season; although not specifically a Christmas-themed film, she felt that the Christmas season's connotations of family togetherness helped to illuminate the film's themes.

The film aired on December 21, 1986.

Awards and nominations

References

External links

1986 films
1986 television films
CBC Television original films
English-language Canadian films
Films based on Canadian novels
Canadian drama television films
Films directed by Martin Lavut
1980s Canadian films